The 1928 U.S. National Championships (now known as the US Open) was a tennis tournament that took place on the outdoor grass courts at the West Side Tennis Club, Forest Hills in New York City, United States. The women's tournament was held from 20 August until 27 August while the men's tournament ran from 10 September until 17 September. It was the 48th staging of the U.S. National Championships and the fourth Grand Slam tennis event of the year.

Finals

Men's singles

 Henri Cochet defeated  Francis Hunter  4–6, 6–4, 3–6, 7–5, 6–3

Women's singles

 Helen Wills defeated  Helen Jacobs  6–2, 6–1

Men's doubles
 George Lott /  John Hennessey defeated  Gerald Patterson /  Jack Hawkes 6–2, 6–1, 6–2

Women's doubles
 Hazel Hotchkiss Wightman /  Helen Wills defeated  Edith Cross /  Anna McCune Harper 6–2, 6–2

Mixed doubles
 Helen Wills /  Jack Hawkes defeated  Edith Cross /  Edgar Moon 6–1, 6–3

References

External links
Official US Open website

 
U.S. National Championships
U.S. National Championships (tennis) by year
U.S. National Championships
U.S. National Championships
U.S. National Championships
U.S. National Championships